Risor ruber, the Tusked goby, is a species of goby native to reefs of the western Atlantic Ocean from southern Florida to the Bahamas and south to northern Brazil.  This species associates with barrel sponges, sometimes living within the sponge.  This species can reach a length of  TL.  It is currently the only known member of its genus.

References

Gobiinae
Monotypic fish genera
Fish described in 1911